The Dolphin mine is a large open pit and underground mine located in the Bass Strait on King Island, Tasmania, Australia. Dolphin represents one of the largest tungsten reserves in Australia having estimated reserves of 2.7 million tonnes of ore grading 1.04% tungsten.

See also

 List of mines in Australia
 Mining in Australia

References 

Tungsten mines in Australia
Mines in Tasmania
Underground mines in Australia
Surface mines in Australia
King Island (Tasmania)